The 2009 FIA WTCC Race of UK (formally the 2009 FIA WTCC Marriott Race of UK) was the eighth round of the 2009 World Touring Car Championship season and the fifth FIA WTCC Race of UK. It was held on 19 July 2009 at the Brands Hatch circuit in Kent, England. The first race was won by Alain Menu for Chevrolet and the second race was won by Augusto Farfus for BMW Team Germany. The round was overshadowed by the death of Henry Surtees in the second FIA Formula Two Championship support race.

Background
Yvan Muller arrived at Brands Hatch with a 14 point lead over SEAT Sport teammate Gabriele Tarquini, with BMW's Augusto Farfus a further point behind.

The race saw four new drivers for the 2009 season. ADAC Procar Series champion Philip Geipel joined Liqui Moly Team Engstler in a third BMW 320si. Meanwhile, Swedish team Polestar Racing entered two Volvo C30s for Robert Dahlgren and WTCC newcomer Tommy Rustad, however both Volvos were ineligible to score championship points.  Norbert Michelisz drove the SUNRED Engineering-run SEAT Leon Eurocup prize car, as he did at Okayama in 2008.

Report

Free Practice
Augusto Farfus went quickest in the first free practice session on the Saturday morning.  The Brazilian BMW Team Germany driver then went quickest in the second session later in the morning.

Qualifying
Farfus went quickest in the first qualifying session. Amongst those who failed to make it through into the second session were Yvan Muller and Jordi Gene. Chevrolet's Alain Menu and Rob Huff locked out the front row of the grid after the second session, with the BMWs of Andy Priaulx and Augusto Farfus. Guest independent SEAT driver Norbert Michelisz qualified tenth, the leading independent. Jorg Muller, Robert Dahlgren, Jordi Gene and Kristian Poulsen all received grid penalties ahead of the first race. Muller received a five-place penalty for driving in the fast lane of the pits before the pit lane had been opened at the beginning of the session. Dahlgren had all his times disallowed because his team worked on the car during the parc ferme conditions between Q1 and Q2. The Swede dropped from 13th to the back of the grid. Gene also had his times disallowed because the engine speed sensor of his car's data logging system was disconnected, and he also dropped to the back row of the grid. Poulsen received a 10-place grid drop after having the engine in his BMW changed, although he had only qualified 22nd anyway.

Warm Up
Andy Priaulx went fastest in the Sunday morning warm-up session. The major story though was James Thompson setting the eighth quickest time in the Lada Priora.

Race One
The first race started with a multi-car accident at the Druids hairpin as Yvan Muller and Augusto Farfus tangled. Felix Porteiro and Norbert Michelisz were also heavily involved with many others taking to the grass on the inside and outside of the corner in avoidance. The incident brought the safety car out. Huff lead Menu from the restart, although Menu re-passed Huff for the lead on lap five. The two Chevrolet drivers remained out in front until the end of the race, although Priaulx pushed Huff for second in the final laps, having passed Gabriele Tarquini for third.

The safety car made a second appearance later in the race as Sergio Hernández, Vito Postiglione and  Tommy Rustad tangled at Surtees. Farfus made his way through the field after his first lap incident to claim eighth place and pole position for Race 2.

Stefano D'Aste won the Independents Trophy from Tom Coronel and Tom Boardman. Menu set the fastest lap.

Race Two
Race two was won by pole-sitter Augusto Farfus from BMW Team Germany teammate Jörg Müller. SEAT Sport drivers Gabriele Tarquini and Rickard Rydell finished third and fourth ahead of Andy Priaulx. Yvan Muller battled through from the back of the field to take seventh place in an otherwise uneventful race.

Tom Boardman took his first ever Independent's Trophy win in tenth overall. Jörg Müller set the fastest lap of the race.

Results

Qualifying

Race 1

Bold denotes Fastest lap.

Race 2

Bold denotes Fastest lap.

Standings after the race

Drivers' Championship standings

Yokohama Independents' Trophy standings

Manufacturers' Championship standings

 Note: Only the top five positions are included for both sets of drivers' standings.

References

External links
 Results Booklet PDF at MST Systems

Race of UK
UK